Abu Zar Ghaffari  is a neighborhood in the Karachi Central district of Karachi, Pakistan. It was previously administered as part of New Karachi Town, which was disbanded in 2011.

There are several ethnic groups in Abu Zar Ghaffari including Muhajirs, Sindhis, Punjabis, Kashmiris, Seraikis, Pakhtuns, Balochis, Memons, Bohras,  Ismailis, etc. Over 99% of the population is Muslim. The population of New Karachi Town is estimated to be nearly one million.

References

External links 
 Karachi website

Neighbourhoods of Karachi
New Karachi Town